Christa Göhler (18 October 1935 – 31 October 2010) was a German cross-country skier. She competed in the women's 10 kilometres at the 1960 Winter Olympics.

Cross-country skiing results

Olympic Games

World Championships

References

External links
 

1935 births
2010 deaths
German female cross-country skiers
Olympic cross-country skiers of the United Team of Germany
Cross-country skiers at the 1960 Winter Olympics
Sportspeople from Saxony